Elections to the Stewartry District Council took place in May 1988, alongside elections to the councils of Scotland's various other districts. The number of seats and the total vote share won by each party is listed below.

References

Dumfries and Galloway Council elections
1988 Scottish local elections